Liyuan South Road Station is an underground metro station in Ningbo, Zhejiang, China. It is located at the crossing of Xindian Road and Liyuan South Road. Construction of the station started in December 2010 and it opened on September 26, 2015.

Exits 
Liyuan South Road Station has 3 exits.

References 

Railway stations in Zhejiang
Railway stations in China opened in 2015
Ningbo Rail Transit stations